Augustin Gensse and Éric Prodon were the defending champions, but they chose to not participate.
Steve Darcis and Dominik Meffert won in the final 5–7, 7–5, [10–7], against Uladzimir Ignatik and Martin Kližan.

Seeds

Draw

Draw

External links
 Main Draw

Morocco Tennis Tour - Tanger - Doubles
Morocco Tennis Tour – Tanger
2010 Morocco Tennis Tour